is a Japanese comedy tokusatsu series directed by Noboru Iguchi, director of The Machine Girl and RoboGeisha. The show aired on MBS every Wednesday night at 25:25 JST. The ending theme is Denki Groove's .

In October 2010, Dogoo Girl premiered its sequel . The show adds five more Dogoo Girls portrayed by Misaki Momose, Rina Takeda, Manami Nomoto (of Idoling!!!), Maria Yoshikawa, and Haruka Dan.

Plot
By chance, a hikikomori named Makoto Sugihara finds a strange breastplate buried in the woods. When he places his palm on the breast plate, its design gets burned into his palm while the action awakens a girl named Dogu-chan, a hyperactive yōkai hunter from the Jōmon period with large breasts. Because he had touched her breastplate, Makoto is now bound to Dogu-chan as she adapts to modern day life, fighting yōkai in magic armor formed by her dogū assistant Dokigoro while slowly prying Makoto out of his shell as he is dragged into her misadventures, whether he likes it or not.

In the sequel, a college student named Shouta Tsuikimiya moves into the house where his archaeologist father, Yuzo, had last been living when he disappeared.  Shouta inadvertently awakens Doji-chan, a novice yōkai hunter, when he finds her breastplate half-buried in the garden of the house.  As if juggling his classes with dealing with the clingy and doting Doji-chan were not enough, Shouta soon finds that Doji-chan's fellow apprentices, as well as their mentor (Dogu-chan from the previous series), have taken up residence in his house as well.

Episodes
Each episode is named after the yōkai Dogu-chan fights. The literal translation of the yōkai's name is given in the episode titles below. The guest star who portrays the yōkai is also listed.
 
 
 
 
 
 
 
 
 
 
 
 
Dogoon V

Cast
 :  of Idoling!!!
 : Masataka Kubota
 : 
 : 
 : 
 : 
 : 
Dogoon V
 : 
 : 
 :  of Idoling!!!
 : 
 : 
 : 
 :

Guest stars
Sonim

Yumi Adachi

Dogoon V
 Sei Ashina
 Yuko Ito
 Kenji Ohtsuki
 Megumi Kagurazaka

Movie adaption
On February 9, 2010, Outcast Cinema announced the film adaption of the series. Several episodes of the show (including its unaired pilot), helmed by various directors, were edited into a feature film which debuted theatrically in Japan on February 20, 2010.

References

External links
The Ancient Dogoo Girl - Official website
The Ancient Dogoo Girl - Official MBS website
Dogoon V - Official website

2009 Japanese television series debuts
2010 Japanese television series endings
Tokusatsu television series
Mainichi Broadcasting System original programming